Narsingdi Gas Field is a natural gas field located in Narsingdi District, Bangladesh. It is a company under the control of Bangladesh Gas Fields Company Limited.

Location
Narsingdi gas field is located in Shibpur Upazila of the Narsingdi District of Dhaka Division, which is about 45 km northeast of the capital Dhaka, and adjacent to the Dhaka-Sylhet Highway.

Discovery
In 1990, Petrobangla discovered this gas field.

Excavations and wells
From this gas field, gas is lifted from one of the wells in a vertical depth of 11,320 feet and another well at a depth of 10,778 feet, of which gas levels are ranging from 10,440 to 10,446 feet and to 10,427 to 10,470 feet deep, respectively.

See also 
 List of natural gas fields in Bangladesh
 Bangladesh Gas Fields Company Limited
 Gas Transmission Company Limited

References

1990 establishments in Bangladesh
Narsingdi District
Economy of Dhaka
Natural gas fields in Bangladesh